is a city located in southern Okayama Prefecture, Japan. , the city had an estimated population of 36,499 in 15,934 households and a population density of 290 persons per km².

Geography
Setouchi is located in southeastern Okayama Prefecture(called the Tobi region) to the east of the prefectural capital of Okayama city. It faces the Seto Inland Sea to the south, and the coastline is intricate and forms part of the Setonaikai National Park. Inhabited islands such as Nagashima and the Ushimado Islands and within the city limits.The western part forms part of the Okayama Plain across the Yoshii River and is called the Sencho Plain. Most of the area is mountain forest at an elevation of 100 to 300 meters.

Adjoining municipalities
Okayama Prefecture
Higashi-ku, Okayama
Bizen

Climate
Setouchi has a humid subtropical climate (Köppen climate classification Cfa).

Demographics
Per Japanese census data, the population of Setouchi in 2020 is 36,048 people. Setouchi has been conducting censuses since 1950.

History
The area Setouchi was part of ancient Bizen Province. 
Port Ushimado was a famous port till the early modern era. It served messengers from Korea to the Imperial Court and later to the Tokugawa shogunate. The port is today a good spot for sightseeing and sailing. Osafune was famous for the production of katana in the 12th century under the name of Bizen Osafune. Fukuoka District, which flourished as a trade center and later a political center along the Seto Inland Sea until the beginning of the Edo period, served by the Yoshii River and the Seto Inland Sea, is also included as a part of the city.  The Fukuoka Market (Fukuoka no Ichi) was recorded in the scroll Ippen Shonin Emaki, drawn in the 13th century. At the end of the Kamakura period a castle was built in Fukuoka. In the middle Muromachi period, the daimyō who governed Bizen province took this castle as their site, rebuilt and fortified it more than before. Because the Yoshii River changed its course and most of Fukuoka including the castle sank under the river, the castle was abandoned. During the Edo Period, the area was part of the holdings of Okayama Domain. After the Meiji restoration, the area was organized into villages, including the village of Oku within Oku District, Okayama on June 1, 1889 with the creation of the modern municipalities system. Oku was raised to town status on April 1, 1952 after merging with five neighboring villages.  The city of Setouchi was founded on November 1, 2004, by the merger of Oku with the towns of Osafune and Ushimado (all from Oku District). Its city hall is the former town hall of Oku.

Government
Setouchi has a mayor-council form of government with a directly elected mayor and a unicameral city council of 18 members. Setouchi contributes one member to the Okayama Prefectural Assembly. In terms of national politics, the city is part of the Okayama 2nd district of the lower house of the Diet of Japan.

Economy
Setouchi has a mixed economy, based on agriculture, (rice, pumpkins, cabbage, mushrooms, olives), commercial fishing (aquaculture of oysters) and industry. Historically, the area was noted for its production of sea salt and production of Japanese swords.

Education
Setouchi has nine public elementary schools and three public junior high schools, and one public high school operated by the Okayama prefectural Board of Education.

Transportation

Railway 
 JR West (JR West) - Akō Line
  -  -

Highways

Sister city relations
  Mytilene, Greece (sister city since July, 1982) 
  Horokanai, Hokkaidō, Japan (1989)  
  Tsushima, Nagasaki, Japan (1996)

Local attractions
Yumeji Art Museum
Kadota Shell Mound, National Historic Site
Bizen Osafune Japanese sword Museum
Honren-ji, National Historic Site

Noted people from Setouchi
Yōichi Amano, manga artist
Yumeji Takehisa, artist

References

External links

Setouchi City official website 

Cities in Okayama Prefecture
Populated coastal places in Japan
Setouchi, Okayama